Igor Volodymyrovych Maksymenko  — (September 6, 1984, Kharkiv) — master of sports of Ukraine of the international class in kickboxing and taekwondo, winner of World Cup in kickboxing.

Biography 

He was born on September 6, 1984 in Kharkiv, in the Ukrainian SSR of the Soviet Union (in present-day Ukraine). Igor is a Ukrainian by nationality.  Mother is Maksymenko Olena Anatoliivna, teacher of the elementary classes. Father is Maksymenko Volodymyr Anatoliiovych, metal worker/welder. Brothers are Ivan and Maksym, sisters are Iryna, Daryna and Anastasiia.
 1991 – went to the  first grade of the secondary school #66 of Kharkiv.
 1993 – moved to the village of Komsomolske of Kharkiv Oblast. In the same year moved up to the secondary school #1 of Komsomolske which finished in 2001.
 2002 – became the winner of the World Cup Peter the Great Cup in taekwondo. The same year he entered Kharkiv state academy of physical education at the specialty of trainer-instructor in taekwondo.
 2004 – left the university due to personal reasons.
 2004 – achieved the status of master of spots of Ukraine in taekwondo. The same year became the silver prize winner of World Cup in kickboxing (WAKO).
 2005 – became the Champion of Europe in taekwondo  (Italy) and passed international class of master of sports of Ukraine.
 2007 – began the trainer activity in the All-Ukrainian Union of  taekwondo , where has been working till nowadays.
 2009 – became the winner of the World Cup of Europe in taekwondo (Poland).
 2010 – became the winner of the professional tournament of PRO TKD (Moldova). In the following year updated the studies at the KSAPE (Russian: ХДАФК).
 April 2011 – acquired the status of champion in the All-Ukrainian Union of taekwondo.
 June 2011 – acquired the title of winner of the World Cup in kickboxing (WAKO «Bestfighter» — 2011), which was held in Rimini (Italy).

Achievements 

 World Cup winner of “Peter the Great Cup” in taekwondo — 2002;
 Master of sports of Ukraine in taekwondo  — 2004;
 Silver prize winner of kickboxing  (WAKO) — 2004;
 Champion of Europe in taekwondo— 2005;
 Master of sports of Ukraine in the international class of taekwondo— 2005;
 European Cup Winner in taekwondo— 2009;
 Winner of the professional tournament PRO TKD — 2010;
 Match Meeting winner of taekwondo Ukraine-Poland — 2010;
 Champion of All-Ukrainian Union of taekwondo — 2011;
 World Cup Winner in kickboxing WAKO Bestfighter — 2011.

Interests 
Sport, modern music, cars, travelling.

Примітки 

Ukrainian male taekwondo practitioners
Ukrainian male kickboxers
1984 births
Living people
Sportspeople from Kharkiv